Al Neel Sports Club also known as Al Neel Al-Khartoum is a Sudanese football club based in Khartoum, it was founded in 1934. They play in the top division in Sudanese football, Sudan Premier League. Their home stadium is Khartoum Stadium. The team won the Sudan Cup in 1978.

Honours

National titles
Khartoum League

Performance in CAF competitions
African Cup Winners' Cup: 0 appearances
1979 – Withdrew

References

External links

Football clubs in Sudan
Association football clubs established in 1934